Boldino is a rural locality (a village) in Kultayevskoye Rural Settlement, Permsky District, Perm Krai, Russia. The population was 73 as of 2010. There are 10 streets.

Geography 
Boldino is located 24 km southwest of Perm (the district's administrative centre) by road. Chuvaki is the nearest rural locality.

References 

Rural localities in Permsky District